Hüttener Berge is an Amt ("collective municipality") in the district of Rendsburg-Eckernförde, in Schleswig-Holstein, Germany. Its seat is in Groß Wittensee. It was formed on 1 January 2008 from the former Ämter Hütten and Wittensee.

The Amt Hüttener Berge consists of the following municipalities:

References

Ämter in Schleswig-Holstein
Regions of Schleswig-Holstein